Qilombo (formerly The Holdout) was a community space in West Oakland, California,  United States of America  from 2011 through 2019. It was originally opened as an anarchist self-managed social center then changed its name and became a space for local Black and Brown people from 2014 onwards. The centre initiated the Afrika Town project and created the Afrika Town garden on an empty lot adjacent to the Qilombo building. Qilombo fought its eviction and was finally closed in 2019 by Alameda County officials.

History 

The Holdout opened in 2011, at 2313 San Pablo Avenue in West Oakland, as an anarchist self-managed social center. It operated under that name for three years. In January 2014 the Holdout closed its doors, re-opening under the name Qilombo. The new African American collective announced in a statement that the name was changed to Qilombo because the first quilombos (from the Kimbundu word "kilombo") were communities Maroons set up between the 16th and 19th centuries by African people in South America as refuges from slavery and colonialism. The collective aimed to represent the interests of Black and Brown people living locally. Over the next four years, Qilombo hosted events and launched the Afrika Town neighborhood revitalization campaign.

Afrika Town 

Afrika Town (also spelled Afrikatown) was an initiative started by members of Qilombo in 2014, which aimed to resist gentrification and support local communities. Programs included self defense classes, free breakfasts and needle exchange.

After a mural was painted on the wall of Qilombo from a neighboring empty lot in 2014, local people decided to make the lot into a garden. Like Qilombo itself, the Afrika Town Garden was under threat of eviction because it was within the West Oakland Specific Plan (WOSP). The garden was built on land owned by real estate investor Noel Yi and 2015, he began a campaign to evict the garden. The eviction process lasted three years. A court order dated March 5, 2018, granted a preliminary injunction in favor of Noel Yi, ordering Afrika Town to vacate the lot.

Closure 
In 2016, the building housing Qilombo was purchased by real estate mogul Neil Sullivan.  Sullivan refused to renew Qilombo's lease.  Qilombo resisted eviction and continued to occupy the space until January 9, 2019, when Alameda County officials accompanied the property managers to change the locks, closing it permanently.

References 

Social centres in the United States
Anarchist communities
2011 establishments in California
2019 disestablishments in California
Oakland, California
Gentrification in the United States